The 2021 Major League Baseball season began on April 1, while the regular season ended on October 3. The postseason began on October 5. The World Series then began on October 26 and ended on November 2 with the Atlanta Braves defeating the Houston Astros in six games to win their second title since moving to Atlanta.

For the second consecutive year, cross-border travel restrictions due to the COVID-19 pandemic forced the Toronto Blue Jays to open their home schedule in the United States, with tenures in Dunedin, Florida, and Buffalo, New York. Later, the Canadian government granted an exemption to allow the Blue Jays to return to Rogers Centre in Toronto, Ontario, beginning July 30.

The 91st All-Star Game held on July 13 was supposed to be held at Truist Park, the home of the Braves, but league officials moved the game to Coors Field, home of the Colorado Rockies, following the passage of the Georgia Senate Bill 202 by the Georgia General Assembly, which MLB considered to be restrictive of voting rights.

This was the final season of the Cleveland Indians competing with that nickname. On December 14, 2020, the team announced that they would unveil their new moniker and associated uniform and stadium changes before the 2022 season to replace the 106-year-old nickname.  On July 23, the Indians revealed that their new nickname would be the "Guardians", debuting the following season.

Schedule
Major League Baseball announced the 2021 regular season schedule on July 9, 2020. A full 162-game season was played. As has been the case since 2013, all teams played their four division opponents 19 times each for a total of 76 games. They played six to seven games against each of the other ten same-league opponents for a total of 66 games, and 20 interleague games. For the second season in a row, interleague play will be between corresponding regions (AL East vs. NL East, AL Central vs. NL Central, and AL West vs. NL West) rather than continue the annual rotation. This included the New York Mets and New York Yankees being scheduled to play a series from September 10–12, which featured commemorations of the 20th anniversary of the September 11 attacks in 2001. The 20 interleague games each team played consisted of two three-game series (one home, one away) against its natural rival (total of six games), two two-game series (one home, one away) against each team for two other opponents (total of eight games), and a single three-game series against each team for the last two (one home, one away; total of six games).

The MLB at Field of Dreams game, originally scheduled for 2020 but canceled due to the COVID-19 pandemic, featured a matchup between the New York Yankees and the Chicago White Sox at a purpose-built ballpark in Dyersville, Iowa on August 12.  The White Sox won the game 9–8 when Tim Anderson hit a walk-off two-run home run in the bottom of the ninth.

The 2021 MLB Little League Classic featured a matchup between the Los Angeles Angels and the Cleveland Indians at Bowman Field in Williamsport, Pennsylvania, on August 22.  The Indians won the game 3–0.

Rule changes

On February 9, Major League Baseball announced the following temporary rule changes for the 2020 season would continue in the 2021 regular season:
 A runner will be placed on second base at the start of every half-inning of any game that goes into extra innings.
 Doubleheaders will be played as two seven-inning games.

Additionally, the broader use of suspended games was carried over from the 2020 season:
 If a game cannot continue because of inclement weather and it is not an official game (trailing team has played less than five innings), the game will be declared a suspended game, continuing from the point of interruption instead of completely restarting.
If a suspended game resumes with the trailing team having played less than five innings, a normally-scheduled game played after the completion of the suspended game will be seven innings.
However, if a game is halted after the fifth inning for a reason that enables it to be a suspended game (like a field issue or equipment failure or if the game was tied when stopped), the game played afterwards retains its nine-inning length.
In all cases, a suspended game retains the length (seven or nine innings) that it was scheduled for at the time it started.

An increase of the active roster size to 26 players, originally planned for the 2020 season, took effect. Other changes that had also been planned—a limit of 13 pitchers on active rosters and restrictions on position players pitching—were waived for 2021.

COVID-19 protocols from the 2020 season remain in effect, but may be eased by teams once 85% of their tier-one staff (players, manager staff) are fully vaccinated.

Foreign substances controversy

On June 15, MLB announced that any player found with a foreign substance (used to doctor a baseball or to improve their grip on a baseball) would be immediately ejected from the game, and would receive a 10-game suspension. Heightened enforcement of existing rules that prohibit such substances began after widespread use by pitchers to increase their grip and spin rate.

Standings

American League

National League

Postseason

Bracket

Managerial changes

General managers

Offseason

Field managers

Offseason

League leaders

American League

National League

Milestones

Batters
Yermín Mercedes (CWS):
Became the second player in Major League modern history to record five hits in his first career start. Mercedes recorded the five hits on April 2 against the Los Angeles Angels.  He joins Cecil Travis who accomplished this feat during the 1933 season.
Became the first player in Major League modern history to record eight hits in his first eight at-bats of the season with his first three hits on April 3 against the Angels.  His streak ended when he flied out against Tony Watson. Chris Stynes had the longest streak to start a season during the Expansion Era (dating back to 1961) at seven during the 1997 season.
Akil Baddoo (DET):
Became the 31st player in Major League history to hit a home run on the first pitch that they saw. Baddoo accomplished this feat on April 4 against the Cleveland Indians and Aaron Civale. The last person to do this was Willson Contreras on June 19, 2016.
Tim Locastro (NYY)/:
On April 10 against the Cincinnati Reds, Locastro stole second base in the sixth inning, setting the Major League record for most successful consecutive steals to start a career, with 28, since 1951 (the National League did not track caught steals before 1951). He broke the record that was previously held by Tim Raines.
Miguel Cabrera (DET):
With a single in the fifth-inning against the Kansas City Royals on May 12, Cabrera became the all-time hit leader of Venezuelan-born Major Leaguers by passing Omar Vizquel with his 2,878th hit.
With his double in the sixth-inning against the Kansas City Royals on June 15, Cabrera reached 5,000 total bases for his career. He became the 22nd player to reach this mark.
Recorded his 500th career home run, against the Toronto Blue Jays in the sixth-inning on August 22. He became the 28th player to reach this mark.
Scored his 1,500th career run, against the St. Louis Cardinals in the ninth-inning on August 25. He became the 74th player to reach this mark.
Kyle Schwarber (BOS)/:
Tied the Major League record of most home runs hit during any two-game span by hitting five against the New York Mets on June 19–20.  This was last accomplished by Jose Abreu during the 2020 campaign.
With two more home runs on June 24, he became the first player in Major League history to homer 12 times in the leadoff spot across 13 games. Schwarber also became the seventh player in Major League history to hit eight-plus home runs in a five-game span.
With his leadoff home run on June 29 against Rich Hill of the Tampa Bay Rays, Schwarber tied the Major League record for most home runs in any ten-game stretch with 12 home runs.  He tied the record set by the Indians' Albert Belle in 1995. The home run also tied the Major League record for most home runs in an 18-game stretch with 16. He joins the Giants' Barry Bonds (2001) and Cubs' Sammy Sosa (1998) with this feat.
Trea Turner (LAD)/:
On June 30 against the Tampa Bay Rays, Turner hit for the cycle for the third time in his career. He became the fifth player in Major League history to hit for three cycles during their career. He holds the Major League record along with John Reilly, Bob Meusel, Babe Herman, Adrián Beltré, and Christian Yelich, who accomplished the feat in 2022.
Albert Pujols (LAD)/:
With his single in the eighth inning against the Miami Marlins on July 5, Pujols reached 6,000 total bases for his career. He became the fourth player to reach this mark, joining Hank Aaron, Stan Musial and Willie Mays.
Shohei Ohtani (LAA):
With his 32nd home run on July 7 against the Boston Red Sox, Ohtani established a new record for most home runs in a season by a Japanese-born player in the Major Leagues, breaking the record of 31 set by Hideki Matsui in 2004.
Ohtani became the first player in Major League history to ever have at least 37 home runs and 15 stolen bases before the end of July.
On August 28 against the San Diego Padres, Ohtani becomes the first Japanese-born player to steal 20 bases and hit 40 home runs in a season.
On September 25, Ohtani joined Willie Mays as the only players with at least 45 home runs, 20 stolen bases and six triples in a season.
From September 22–25, Ohtani drew 13 walks in a four-game span, tying a Major League record set by Babe Ruth in 1930, Bryce Harper in 2016, and Yasmani Grandal in 2021. His 11 walks drawn in the three-game span also tied the Major League record set by Harper in 2016.
On October 3 against the Seattle Mariners, Ohtani became the first player in Major League history to have at least 45 homers, 25 stolen bases, 100 RBIs, 100 runs, and eight triples in a season and the second player in AL history to record at least 45 homers and 25 stolen bases in a season, joining Jose Canseco in 1998.
Rodolfo Castro (PIT):
On July 28 against the Milwaukee Brewers, Castro hit two home runs, which were his fourth and fifth Major League hits. All of his hits to that point had been home runs, which was the first time in Modern Era (since 1901) that a player's first five hits were home runs. The streak came to an end on July 30 as he doubled in the first inning against the Philadelphia Phillies.
Seby Zavala (CWS):
On July 31 against the Cleveland Indians, Zavala became the first Major League player to hit his first three career home runs in the same game. Zavala hit his first two off of Triston McKenzie, one of them being a grand slam, and the third was off of Bryan Shaw.
Jonah Heim (TEX)
On August 1 against the Seattle Mariners, Heim became the first rookie in Major League history to hit walk-off home runs in two consecutive games. The first was off Diego Castillo in extra innings and the second was off Erik Swanson.
Kevin Newman (PIT):
Tied the Major League record for most doubles in a game by hitting four against the Milwaukee Brewers in the first game of a doubleheader on August 14. Former Pirates Adam Frazier and Paul Waner also accomplished this feat.
Joey Votto (CIN):
Recorded his 2,000th career hit with a single in the seventh inning against the Chicago Cubs on August 16. He became the 291st player to reach this mark.
Freddie Freeman / Ozzie Albies / Dansby Swanson / Austin Riley (ATL):
With Albies 25th home run on September 4 against the Colorado Rockies, the Braves became the second team in Major League history to have each of their starting infielders hit 25 or more home runs in the same season. They join the 2008 Florida Marlins as the only other quartet of infielders to achieve this feat.
Vladimir Guerrero Jr. (TOR):
Hit his 40th home run on September 6 against the New York Yankees.  With this home run, Vladimir Guerrero and Guerrero Jr. became the second father-son duo to have 40-home-run seasons, joining Cecil Fielder and Prince Fielder.
Hit his 48th home run of the season on October 3 against the Baltimore Orioles.  With this home run, Guerrero Jr. set the Major League record for most home runs in an age-22 season or younger, breaking the record of 47 set in 1953 by 21-year-old Eddie Mathews.
Wander Franco (TB):
By drawing a walk in the seventh inning on September 7 against the Boston Red Sox, Franco set the American League record for the longest on-base streak, at 37 games, for a player 20-years-old or younger.  He broke the record of 36 games that was held by Mickey Mantle, who set the record from early September 1951 through early May 1952.
With his first-inning double on September 29 against the Houston Astros, Franco extended his streak to 43 consecutive games reaching base.  This tied the Major League record for a player 20-years-old or younger with Frank Robinson who set the record during the 1956 campaign.  Although he reached on an error in the ninth-inning the very next night, Franco's record-tying consecutive on-base streak came to an end as he went 0-for-4.
Nelson Cruz (TB)/:
With two home runs on September 7 against the Boston Red Sox, Cruz became the oldest player in Major League history to have a 30-homer season.  Cruz, at age 41, bested the record of David Ortiz and Darrell Evans who were 40-years-old when they had their 30-homer seasons.
Marcus Semien (TOR):
Hit his 44th home run for the season on September 29 against the New York Yankees in the first-inning.  This set a Major League record for most home runs by a second baseman in Major League history, breaking the record of 43 that was set in 1973 by Davey Johnson.

Pitchers

No-hitters

Joe Musgrove (SD):
Musgrove threw his first career no-hitter, and the first no-hitter in the franchise's 53-season history, by defeating the Texas Rangers 3–0 on April 9. He struck out 10 and did not walk a batter, throwing 77 of his 112 pitches as strikes. The only blemish was when Musgrove hit Joey Gallo with a pitch in the fourth inning.
Carlos Rodón (CWS):
Rodón threw his first career no-hitter, and the 20th in franchise history, by defeating the Cleveland Indians 8–0 on April 14. He struck out seven, throwing 75 strikes on 114 pitches. Rodón was perfect through 8 but lost his bid for a perfect game when he hit Roberto Pérez on his foot.
John Means (BAL):
Means threw his first career no-hitter, and the tenth in franchise history, and the first Orioles' complete game no-hitter in 52 years, by defeating the Seattle Mariners 6–0 on May 5. He struck out 12, throwing 79 strikes on 113 pitches. The only blemish came with one out in the third inning, when Sam Haggerty reached first base on a third strike wild pitch. Means faced the minimum 27 batters, as Haggerty was caught attempting to steal second base. This was the first no-hitter in Major League history in which the only baserunner for the team that was no-hit reached base by an uncaught third strike as well as the first no-hitter in Major League history that was not a perfect game in which the team that was no-hit did not have any batters reach base by a walk, a hit by pitch, or an error.
Wade Miley (CIN):
Miley threw his first career no-hitter, and the 17th in franchise history, by defeating the Cleveland Indians 3–0 on May 7. He struck out eight, throwing 72 strikes on 114 pitches. He was perfect through 6 before he allowed two baserunners in the seventh inning on a fielding error by Nick Senzel and a walk. Those were his only baserunners allowed.
Spencer Turnbull (DET):
Turnbull threw his first career no-hitter, and the eighth in franchise history, by defeating the Seattle Mariners 5–0 on May 18. He struck out nine, throwing 77 strikes on 117 pitches. He walked two during the outing. Turnbull became the fifth pitcher in Major League history to throw a no-hitter within two seasons of leading the Majors in losses, last accomplished by Scott Erickson with the Twins in 1994.
Corey Kluber (NYY):
Kluber threw his first career no-hitter, and the 12th in franchise history, by defeating the Texas Rangers 2–0 on May 19. He struck out nine, throwing 71 strikes on 101 pitches. His only baserunner was a walk to Charlie Culberson in the third inning. This was the first time since 1969 that no-hitters were thrown on consecutive days.
Zach Davies / Ryan Tepera / Andrew Chafin / Craig Kimbrel (CHC):
Combined to throw the 17th no-hitter in franchise history and the 15th combined no-hitter in Major League history by defeating the Los Angeles Dodgers 4–0 on June 24. Davies struck out four and walked five, throwing 60 of his 94 pitches for strikes. Tepera walked one while throwing 16 pitches, of which nine were strikes. Chafin walked one while throwing 15 pitches, of which 10 were strikes. Kimbrel struck out three and walked one; nine of his fourteen pitches were strikes.
Tyler Gilbert (ARI):
Gilbert threw his first career no-hitter, and the third in franchise history, by defeating the San Diego Padres 7–0 on August 14. In his first career start, Gilbert struck out five, throwing 64 of his 102 pitches for strikes. He issued three walks, all of them to leadoff hitter Tommy Pham. This tied the Major League record for no-hitters in a season, set in 1884.  Gilbert also became the fourth pitcher in Major League history to throw a no-hitter in his first career start.  The last pitcher to accomplish this feet was Bobo Holloman in 1953.  The other two took place in the 1800s.
Corbin Burnes / Josh Hader (MIL):
Threw the second no-hitter in Brewers history, the 16th combined and a record breaking ninth no-hitter in 2021 on September 11 against the Cleveland Indians.  In the 3–0 victory, Burnes went eight innings, walked one and struck out 14 in 115 pitches (78 were for strikes).  Hader finished out the no-hitter by striking out two hitters in the ninth and throwing nine pitches, seven were strikes.  The Indians become the first team in Major League history to be no-hit three times in one season.  Zach Plesac was the starting pitcher in all three games that the Indians did not get a hit.

Other pitching accomplishments
José Berríos (MIN) / Corbin Burnes (MIL):
In their matchup on April 3, they became the first pair of starting pitchers in the modern era (since 1900) that struck out 10 or more batters and gave up one or no hits. Berrios struck out 12 over six innings and did not allow a hit, while Burnes went 6 and gave up one hit and struck out 11.
Matt Peacock (ARI):
Became the first pitcher since 1945 to make his debut in extra innings and record his first hit and win on April 6 against the Colorado Rockies.
Craig Kimbrel (CWS)/:
Recorded his 350th career save in closing out a 4–2 win over the Pittsburgh Pirates on April 8. He became the 12th player to reach this mark.
Became the fastest pitcher in Major League history to reach 1,000 strikeouts in 613 innings pitched on August 16 against the Oakland Athletics.  This record was broken on September 30 by Aroldis Chapman who recorded his 1,000th strikeout in 601 innings.
Shane Bieber (CLE):
Became the first pitcher since 1893 to record 10 strikeouts in each of his first four starts with his 13 strikeout performance against the Cincinnati Reds on April 18.
Corbin Burnes (MIL):
Set the Major League record on April 20 against the San Diego Padres for most strikeouts by a starter to begin a season without issuing a walk. Burnes has struck out 40 batters and broke the record of 35 set by Adam Wainwright in 2013.
Set the Major League record for most strikeouts by a pitcher to begin a season without issuing a walk by getting Harrison Bader of the St. Louis Cardinals on May 13.  The second-inning strikeout was the 52nd strikeout by Burnes and that broke the record held by Kenley Jansen set in 2017.  Burnes streak came to an end later in the game at 58 strikeouts, when he walked Tommy Edman in the fifth inning.  This was, at the time, also a Major League record for most strikeouts without a walk.
Tied the Major League record for most consecutive strikeouts in a row by striking out ten Pittsburgh Pirates on August 11.  Burnes tied the mark set by the Mets' Tom Seaver on April 22, 1970, against the San Diego Padres and equaled in 2021 on June 25 by Aaron Nola against the New York Mets.
Jacob deGrom (NYM):
After his 15-strikeout performance against the Washington Nationals on April 23, deGrom set the Major League record for most strikeouts by a pitcher in their first four starts of a season. He broke the record of 48 that was set by Nolan Ryan in 1978 and equaled by Shane Bieber earlier this season.
deGrom struck out nine against the Boston Red Sox on April 28, which gave him 59 in his first five starts of a season.  He tied the record that was set by Nolan Ryan in 1978.
Madison Bumgarner (ARI):
Threw a "complete game no-hitter" in the second game of a seven-inning doubleheader against the Atlanta Braves on April 25. As the game did not go nine innings, it is not counted as a no-hitter by the Elias Sports Bureau, the official statistician of Major League Baseball.
Gerrit Cole (NYY):
With his strikeout of Joey Gallo on May 17 in the first inning, Cole set a Major League record for most strikeouts without a walk at 59, breaking the record set by Corbin Burnes less than a week before.  Cole extended his record to 61 before he issued a walk to Gallo in the third inning.
Zack Greinke (HOU):
Became the 135th pitcher in Major League history to amass 3,000 career innings pitched during the game against the Los Angeles Dodgers on May 25.
David Price (LAD):
Recorded his 2,000th career strikeout by getting Curt Casali in the third inning against the San Francisco Giants on May 27.  He became the 84th pitcher to reach this mark.
Yu Darvish (SD):
Recorded his 1,500th career strikeout in the sixth inning by getting Steven Souza Jr. of the Los Angeles Dodgers on June 21.  Darvish became the fastest pitcher in Major League history to reach that milestone in 197 games.  He broke the record of Randy Johnson, who need 206 games.
Aaron Nola (PHI):
Tied the Major League record for most consecutive strikeouts in a row by striking out ten New York Mets on June 25 in the first game of a seven-inning doubleheader.  Nola tied the mark that was set by the Mets' Tom Seaver on April 22, 1970, against the San Diego Padres.
Collin McHugh / Josh Fleming / Diego Castillo / Matt Wisler / Pete Fairbanks (TB):
These five pitchers combined to throw a "no-hitter" in the second game of a seven-inning doubleheader against the Cleveland Indians on July 7. As the game did not go nine innings, it is not counted as a no-hitter by the Elias Sports Bureau, the official statistician of Major League Baseball.
Pablo López (MIA):
Set a Major League record for most consecutive strikeouts in the Modern Era (since 1900) to start a game by getting the first nine Atlanta Braves on July 11.  The record was eight and was accomplished by Jim Deshaies (1986), Jacob deGrom (2014) and Germán Márquez (2018).
Alex Reyes (STL):
Closing out the Cardinals 2–1 victory against the San Francisco Giants on July 18, Reyes set the Major League record for most consecutive saves to start a career.  With his 24th straight save, he broke the record that was held by LaTroy Hawkins.  Two days later against the Chicago Cubs, Reyes failed to convert the save, ending his streak at 24 games.
Aroldis Chapman (NYY):
Recorded his 300th career save in closing out a 7–6 win over the Oakland Athletics on August 26.  He became the 31st pitcher to reach this mark.
Became the fastest pitcher in Major League history to reach 1,000 strikeouts in 601 innings pitched on September 30 against the Toronto Blue Jays.  He broke the record that was set by Craig Kimbrel earlier this season.
Chris Sale (BOS):
Recorded his third career immaculate inning on August 26 against the Minnesota Twins, tying the all-time record with Sandy Koufax.
Ervin Santana (KC):
Recorded his 150th career win by getting credited with the win in relief against the Seattle Mariners on August 26.  He became the 265th pitcher to reach this mark.
Max Scherzer (LAD)/:
Recorded his third career immaculate inning on September 12 against the San Diego Padres, tying the all-time record with Sandy Koufax and Chris Sale.
Recorded his 3,000th career strikeout by striking out Eric Hosmer of the San Diego Padres on September 12.  He became the 19th player to reach this mark.
Austin Adams (SD):
Adams set a new Major League record for the Live Ball Era (since 1920) for most hit-batsmen in one season when he hit St. Louis Cardinals catcher Yadier Molina in the eighth inning on September 17.  He broke the record in the Live Ball Era held by Howard Ehmke, who hit 23 batters in 1922 in 279 innings.  Adams set the record in 49 innings.
Jon Lester (STL)/:
Recorded his 200th career win on September 20 against the Milwaukee Brewers.  He became the 119th player to reach this mark.
Adam Wainwright (STL):
Recorded his 2,000th career strikeout by fanning Luis Urías in the fourth inning against the Milwaukee Brewers on September 23.  He became the 85th pitcher to reach this mark.
Shohei Ohtani (LAA):
On September 26 against the Seattle Mariners, Ohtani became the sixth starter in MLB history to make at least 13 home starts without a losing decision and an ERA below 2.00 in a season.
Kenley Jansen (LAD):
Recorded his 350th career save in closing out an 8–6 win over the Milwaukee Brewers on October 1.  He became the 13th player to reach this mark.

Miscellaneous
Arizona Diamondbacks:
Became the first team in Major League Opening Day history to hit four home runs in one inning on April 1 against the San Diego Padres.
With their road loss to the San Francisco Giants on June 16, the Diamondbacks tied the Major League record for most consecutive road losses at 22 games.  They tied the record that was set by the 1943 Philadelphia Athletics and equaled by the 1963 New York Mets.  The Diamondbacks set a new Major League record for road futility the next day against the Giants, as they lost their 23rd straight road game by a score of 10–3. The Diamondbacks would later extend their road losing streak to 24 games when they lost to the San Diego Padres on June 25 before finally ending the streak with a 10–1 win against the Padres the next day.
Marwin González (BOS):
Became the first player in Major League modern history to start at four different positions in the field through his team's first four games of the season. Gonzalez patrolled left field on Opening Day for Boston before manning second base, third base and first base in the ensuing contests, respectively.
Yadier Molina (STL):
Became the sixth catcher in Major League history to catch 2,000 games in his career. He reached this milestone on April 14 against the Washington Nationals. Molina also becomes the first player to do this with a single team.
Boston Red Sox:
In the second game of a doubleheader on April 14 against the Minnesota Twins, the Red Sox became the first team in Major League history to open the season with at least three straight losses and immediately follow that by winning at least nine straight games.
Oakland Athletics:
With their win against the Minnesota Twins on April 21, which was their 11th consecutive win, they became the first team in Major League history to follow an 0–6 start to the season by winning 11 straight games at any point in that same season.
José Godoy (SEA):
Became the 20,000th player to make his Major League debut, on May 21.
Atlanta Braves:
Became the first team in Major League history to hit seven or more home runs and two grand slams in a single game on May 21 against the Pittsburgh Pirates.
Umpire Joe West:
With his umpiring of the Cardinals–White Sox game on May 24, West umpired his 5,375th career Major League regular-season game.  This tied him with Hall of Famer Bill Klem, who retired in 1941.  West announced he will be retiring at the end of the season.  West set a new record the following night, serving as the home-plate umpire.
Major League Baseball:
Josh Donaldson, of the Minnesota Twins, scored Major League Baseball's two millionth run in the sport's history on May 29.  Donaldson scored the run in the first-inning on a hit by Nelson Cruz against the Royals' Ervin Santana.
On July 19, there were seven separate sets of back-to-back home runs hit that set a Major League record.  The players involved in this feat were: Buster Posey and Wilmer Flores (Giants), Max Muncy and Justin Turner (Dodgers), Juan Soto and Josh Bell (Nationals), Pete Alonso and Jeff McNeil (Mets), Kevin Pillar and Michael Conforto (Mets), Pavin Smith and Josh VanMeter (Diamondbacks), Paul Goldschmidt and Dylan Carlson (Cardinals).
On August 31, a game between the New York Mets and the Miami Marlins which had been suspended on April 11 was completed. The 142 days between suspension and resumption set a record for the largest gap in Major League history.
Tony La Russa (CWS):
Moved into second place with the most regular-season wins in Major League history with his 2,764th win as the White Sox defeated the Detroit Tigers 3–0 on June 6.  La Russa broke a tie that he had with John McGraw.  Connie Mack holds the all-time record with 3,731 career wins.
New York Yankees:
Tied the Major League record for most triple plays turned in a season when they turned one on June 20 against the Oakland Athletics.  This was their third triple play of the season.  The last team to turn three triple plays in a season was the 2016 Chicago White Sox.
Los Angeles Dodgers:
Became the first team in Major League history to have a pair of games with two grand slams in the same season. The Dodgers hit two slams on July 10 against the Arizona Diamondbacks, and on May 2 against the Milwaukee Brewers.
Ended the regular season with 106 wins, but finished second in the NL West, a game behind the San Francisco Giants, becoming the team with most wins that failed to finish first in its league or division. The previous record of 104 wins had been set by the 1909 Chicago Cubs and 1942 Brooklyn Dodgers. This also marked the first time in Major League history that two teams in the same division, or even in the same league (American or National), had won 105 or more games in the same season.
St. Louis Cardinals:
The Cardinals became the first team in Major League history to have five Gold Glove winners in one season.

Awards and honors

Regular season

All-MLB Team
Players were selected through fan votes (50%) and votes from a panel of experts (50%). The winners were selected based on merit, with no set number of nominees per position and no distinction between leagues.

Other awards
The Sporting News Player of the Year Award: Shohei Ohtani (LAA)
Comeback Players of the Year: Trey Mancini (BAL, American); Buster Posey (SF, National)
Edgar Martínez Award (Best designated hitter): Shohei Ohtani (LAA)
Hank Aaron Award: Vladimir Guerrero Jr. (TOR, American); Bryce Harper (PHI, National)
Roberto Clemente Award (Humanitarian): Nelson Cruz (TB)/
Mariano Rivera AL Reliever of the Year Award (Best AL reliever): Liam Hendriks (CWS)
Trevor Hoffman NL Reliever of the Year Award (Best NL reliever): Josh Hader (MIL)
Warren Spahn Award (Best left-handed pitcher): Julio Urías (LAD)

Monthly awards

Player of the Month

Rookie of the Month

Pitcher of the Month

Reliever of the Month

Uniforms

Anniversaries and special events
All dates as scheduled and were subject to change.

Wholesale changes
 The San Francisco Giants added names to their home and alternate uniforms.

City Connect uniforms
The Nike MLB "City Connect" program aims to create new uniform designs inspired by the teams' home cities.
The following teams released alternate uniforms as part of Nike's "City Connect" series:

The Boston Red Sox City Connect uniforms featured a yellow base with blue letters as homage to the Boston Marathon, which normally takes place on Patriots' Day.
The San Francisco Giants City Connect uniforms featured an orange and white design, a silhouette of the Golden Gate Bridge and a unique fog gradient across the front, sleeves and numbering of the jerseys.
The Miami Marlins City Connect uniforms featured a red base, white pinstripes and white letters with light blue trim as a tribute to the Cuban Sugar Kings.
The Chicago White Sox City Connect uniforms were in a dark grey shade with white pinstripes and features Gothic-styled lettering as homage to the South Side of Chicago.
The Chicago Cubs City Connect uniforms were dark blue with sky blue accents, with elements inspired by the flag of Chicago. The uniform emblazons "Wrigleyville" in front, in a lettering style similar to the Wrigley Field marquee.
The Arizona Diamondbacks City Connect uniforms were sand with black letters and red numbers, and features "Serpientes" in front as homage to Arizona's Hispanic community.
The Los Angeles Dodgers City Connect uniforms featured a blue cap, jersey and pants with "Los Dodgers" written on the cap and jersey.

Other uniforms
The Los Angeles Dodgers wore gold-trimmed home jerseys on April 9–11 in celebration of their 2020 World Series championship. They also wore these uniforms on June 15 to commemorate the "reopening" of Dodger Stadium to full capacity.
The Red Sox wore a "Boston Strong" patch on April 19, Patriots Day.
Players, managers, and coaches wore No. 42 on April 15 and/or 16 to mark the 74th anniversary of Jackie Robinson's debut in the majors. The Mets and Nationals, who were rained out on April 15, wore them on April 23.
The Cincinnati Reds wore Spanish language "Los Rojos" uniforms on May 5, Cinco de Mayo.
MLB introduced a new Lou Gehrig Day commemoration on June 2, which marked the 80-year anniversary of Gehrig's death, and include appeals to ALS-related charities. All players wore a commemorative Lou Gehrig Day patch, and optionally a red wristband reading "4 ALS" in reference to Gehrig's retired No. 4.
On September 11, the New York Mets wore 2001 era home uniforms with "NEW YORK" on the jersey to mark the 20th anniversary of the September 11 attacks.

Throwbacks
The Atlanta Braves wore their 1974 white pullover jerseys from April 9 to 14 in honor of Hank Aaron and Phil Niekro. They broke out the throwbacks again from July 30 to August 1 for Hank Aaron Weekend. 
The Seattle Mariners wore Seattle Steelheads uniforms on June 19.
The New York Mets wore their 1998–2012 black alternate jerseys and caps for select games.
The San Francisco Giants wore San Francisco Sea Lions uniforms on June 19.
The New York Yankees and Chicago White Sox wore  season throwback uniforms on August 12 for the MLB at Field of Dreams game.

Venues
The Milwaukee Brewers' Miller Park was renamed American Family Field after Madison, Wisconsin-based American Family Insurance outbid the Miller Brewing Company for the ballpark's naming rights. Miller's 20-year contract expired at the end of the 2020 season.

On March 31, the Miami Marlins announced that Marlins Park would be renamed to LoanDepot Park, as the naming rights were sold to Lake Forest, California-based LoanDepot.

COVID-19 restrictions 

Unlike 2020, where all games (except the NLCS and World Series) were played behind closed doors, all MLB teams allowed in-person attendance this season; initial capacities were determined by teams and local health officials, and gradually increased to full capacity over the course of the season as active cases declined and more local residents received COVID-19 vaccines. To help promote vaccination, a number of teams announced that they would sponsor walk-in clinics at their home games (with the Seattle Mariners being the first to do so), and offer promotions such as merchandise or game tickets for those who use the clinics (Atlanta, New York Mets and Yankees), or other promotions for vaccinated spectators at games.

On February 18, the Toronto Blue Jays announced that they would open the home portion of their schedule at TD Ballpark in Dunedin, Florida due to travel restrictions enforced by the Canadian federal government.  On May 5, it was announced that the Blue Jays would return to Sahlen Field in Buffalo—where the team played the majority of their home games in 2020—on June 1. On July 16, the Blue Jays received a National Interest Exemption from the Canadian government to host games at Rogers Centre beginning July 30.

Broadcast rights

Television

National
This was the eighth and final year of the contracts with Fox, ESPN, and TBS before the new seven-year deals begin in 2022. FS1 televised games on Tuesday nights and on Saturday, both during the afternoon and evening. Fox also aired some Saturday night games. ESPN televised games on its flagship Sunday Night Baseball as well as Monday and Wednesday night games and holiday games on Memorial Day and Labor Day. ESPN Sunday Night Baseball telecasts were exclusive.

TBS televised 13 straight weeks of Sunday afternoon games and also televised the National League postseason. The American League postseason was split between ESPN, Fox/FS1, and MLB Network (AL Wild Card on ESPN, the ALDS split between FS1 and MLB Network, and the ALCS on Fox and FS1). For the 22nd straight year, the 2021 World Series aired exclusively on Fox.

A three-game series between the Philadelphia Phillies and the San Francisco Giants, whose regional television rights were both held by the NBC Sports Regional Networks, aired exclusively and nationally on NBC's streaming service Peacock. The first time that NBC Sports produced a nationally televised Major League Baseball game since the year 2000.

ABC televised a Sunday Night Baseball matchup between the Chicago White Sox and the Chicago Cubs on August 8. The broadcast marked ABC's first broadcast of Sunday Night Baseball and the first regular season game it has broadcast since its involvement in The Baseball Network in 1995. Former ABC broadcaster and 2021 Ford C. Frick Award winner  Al Michaels appeared as a special guest.

Local
On January 4, Marquee Sports Network announced that Jon Sciambi would become the television play-by-play voice for the Chicago Cubs, replacing Len Kasper, who moved to the White Sox radio booth as described below. If Sciambi is unavailable due to his commitments to ESPN, either Pat Hughes, Beth Mowins, or Chris Myers would fill in for him. Mowins will be the first woman to perform play-by-play for the Cubs, and fifth league-wide.
In January, Victor Rojas resigned as the television play-by-play voice of the Los Angeles Angels to become the president of the Frisco RoughRiders, a double-A affiliate of the Texas Rangers. The Angels announced on March 13 that Matt Vasgersian will serve as its primary play-by-play voice, with Daron Sutton as the substitute during Vasgersian's ESPN and MLB Network assignments (though for part of the 2021 season, Sutton called most of the games as Vasgersian opted to work remotely). Vasgersian and Sutton were also joined by José Mota, who shared color commentary with Mark Gubicza. However, the Angels parted ways with Sutton after only three months, with Rich Waltz taking over as his replacement.
The Baltimore Orioles and MASN did not renew the contracts of play-by-play voices Gary Thorne and Jim Hunter, analysts Mike Bordick and Rick Dempsey, and studio host Tom Davis, among others. Scott Garceau, who called most Orioles television games last season, took over as the primary play-by-play voice, while Ben McDonald became the backup analyst.
The Cincinnati Reds hired John Sadak to serve as its television play-by-play announcer. Sadak replaced Thom Brennaman, who was suspended and later fired after he used a homophobic slur in a game on August 19 against the Kansas City Royals.
New England Sports Network (NESN) announced plans to produce all Boston Red Sox home games in 4K with HDR, making it only the second team (after the Toronto Blue Jays) to produce all regional home games in 4K.
On March 31, the eve of Opening Day, the Fox Sports Networks were rebranded as Bally Sports as part of an agreement between majority-owner Sinclair Broadcast Group and casino operator Bally's Corporation.
As part of its co-ownership of YES Network, Amazon Prime Video simulcasted 21 of the Yankees games carried on broadcast TV by WPIX for Amazon Prime subscribers in the New York Yankees' home market.

Radio

National
ESPN Radio aired its 24th season of national coverage, including Sunday Night Baseball, Saturday games, Opening Day, Labor Day games, and the entire Major League Baseball postseason.

Local
Nexstar's WGN chose not to continue to originate the Chicago White Sox Radio Network after the current deal's expiration, returning the White Sox back to Good Karma Brands-managed and ESPN Radio-owned WMVP after a fifteen-year interregnum. Len Kasper, formerly the television play-by-play voice for the Chicago Cubs, will move to the South Side to do White Sox radio play-by-play, replacing Andy Masur, who temporarily became the voice of the White Sox for the 2020 season after the death of Ed Farmer.
In November 2020, the Toronto Blue Jays released their radio play-by-play announcer Mike Wilner. In February 2021, Rogers Sports & Media announced that the Toronto Blue Jays Radio Network will not produce a separate broadcast of games for radio this season, and that all broadcasts will now be a simulcast of the television broadcast on Sportsnet with Buck Martinez and Dan Shulman, augmented with radio-exclusive segments hosted by Rob Wong and Shoaib Ali. The team's remaining radio play-by-play announcer Ben Wagner was reassigned as a field reporter. Rogers' statement that this arrangement was due to COVID-19 protocols and to "minimize travel" has been disputed by media outlets, as radio and television broadcasts of all Blue Jays games had already been called remotely during the 2020 season, with no changes in personnel.
 On February 4, Los Angeles Dodgers Spanish-language broadcaster Jorge Jarrín announced his retirement effective immediately. He initially joined the Dodgers in 2004 as a sales and marketing executive, moving to broadcasting in 2012. He initially called televised games alongside former Dodgers star player Manny Mota before moving to radio in 2015, joining his father Jaime on the Dodgers' Spanish radio team.
 On September 28, Jaime Jarrín announced he planned to retire after the 2022 season, his 64th as a part of the Dodgers' Spanish radio broadcast team. Jarrín, who turns 86 in December 2021, plans to work only Dodgers home games in 2022.

Retirements
The following players retired during the 2021 season and before the start of 2022 campaign:

Ty Buttrey – April 3
Devon Travis – April 3
Héctor Rondón – April 9
Jay Bruce – April 18
Neil Walker – April 20
Jerry Blevins – April 27
Jordan Zimmermann – May 11
Tyler Flowers – May 14
Riley Pint – June 8
Dylan Cozens – June 22
Tony Campana – June 26
Chris Smith – June 28 
Welington Castillo – July 4
Daisuke Matsuzaka – July 7 – retired at end of NPB season
Drew Robinson – July 16
Chris Davis – August 12
Nate Jones – August 19
Yadier Molina – August 25 – retired at the end of the 2022 season
Ryan Braun – September 14
Alex Avila – September 19 – retired at the end of the season
Carlos Gómez – September 24
Brandon Snyder – October 2
Bubba Starling – October 26
Buster Posey – November 4
Brett Cecil – November 8
Joakim Soria – November 10
Sean Kazmar Jr. – November 12
Wade Davis – November 24
Christian Colón – December 6
Tim Federowicz – December 7
Ben Rowen – December 10
Andrew Romine – December 11
Kyle Seager – December 29
Cameron Maybin – January 3, 2022
Jon Lester – January 12, 2022
Travis Snider – January 13, 2022
Melky Cabrera – January 14, 2022
Francisco Liriano – January 17, 2022
Wladimir Balentien – January 22, 2022
Gordon Beckham – January 26, 2022
Alec Hansen – January 27, 2022
Montana DuRapau – January 31, 2022
Nicky Delmonico – February 2, 2022
Matt Magill – February 3, 2022
Adrián González – February 5, 2022
Ryan Zimmerman – February 15, 2022
Óliver Pérez – February 21, 2022 – retired at the conclusion of the 2022 Mexican League season
Jake Elmore – February 22, 2022
Matt Szczur – March 7, 2022
Adam Conley – March 11, 2022
Andrew Miller – March 24, 2022
Albert Pujols – March 28, 2022 – retired at the end of the 2022 season
Wade LeBlanc – April 2, 2022
Todd Frazier – April 5, 2022
Jordy Mercer – April 5, 2022
Drew Butera – April 5, 2022
A. J. Ramos – April 6, 2022

Retired numbers
Ted Simmons had his No. 23 officially retired by the St Louis Cardinals on July 31. This was the thirteenth number retired by the team.
Roy Halladay had his No. 34 officially retired by the Philadelphia Phillies on August 8.  This was the seventh number retired by the team.
Jerry Koosman had his No. 36 officially retired by the New York Mets on August 28, after the ceremony was delayed a year due to the COVID-19 pandemic. This was the sixth number retired by the team.
Larry Walker had his No. 33 officially retired by the Colorado Rockies on September 25, after the ceremony was delayed a year due to the COVID-19 pandemic. It was the third number retired by the team.

See also
2021 in baseball
2021 KBO League season
2021 Nippon Professional Baseball season
2021 Chinese Professional Baseball League season
Impact of the COVID-19 pandemic on sports

References

External links
2021 Major League Baseball season

 
Major League Baseball
Major League Baseball seasons